"Worth a Shot" is a song written by Shane McAnally, Josh Osborne, and Ross Copperman, and recorded by American singer Elle King. It was released on June 6, 2022 as the second single from King's third studio album Come Get Your Wife. Dierks Bentley is featured on the song, marking the second collaboration between the two singers, after King previously featured on Bentley's "Different for Girls" from his 2016 album, Black.

Background and composition
"Worth a Shot" was written by Shane McAnally, Josh Osborne, and Ross Copperman, and initially cut by Dierks Bentley as a solo track. Bentley offered it to King, who suggested they turn the song into a duet.

Music video
The music video for "Worth a Shot" premiered on May 18, 2022 and depicts a Wild West theme, with Bentley portraying a wanted man getting rowdy in a saloon and King playing the part of his wife who dons a male disguise to challenge him to a drinking contest, before the sheriff catches up to Bentley and King has to help him flee. Directed by Stephen Kinigopoulos and Alexa Stone, King developed the concept for the video, and it was shot in Murfreesboro, Tennessee.

Charts

References

2022 singles
2022 songs
Elle King songs
Dierks Bentley songs
Songs written by Ross Copperman
Songs written by Shane McAnally
Songs written by Josh Osborne
Song recordings produced by Ross Copperman
RCA Records singles